Marion Oliver McCaw Hall (often abbreviated to McCaw Hall) is a performing arts hall in Seattle, Washington, United States. Located on the grounds of Seattle Center and owned by the city of Seattle, McCaw Hall's two principal tenants are the Seattle Opera and Pacific Northwest Ballet. The building is named for Marion Oliver McCaw, whose four sons donated $20 million to fund a major renovation in 2003. It was formerly known as the Civic Auditorium and Seattle Opera House.

History

The building originally opened in 1928 as the Civic Auditorium. Its construction was funded by a donation from Seattle saloon owner James Osborne and a voter-approved municipal bond issue; the site was donated to the city by David Denny, one of the members of the Denny Party credited with founding the city of Seattle. The auditorium became the home of the Seattle Symphony and also hosted several touring shows. In 1956, voters passed another bond measure to fund expansion of the Civic Auditorium for use as a venue in the upcoming World's Fair. Construction began in 1959, and the auditorium reopened as the Seattle Opera House on April 21, 1962 – the opening day of the World's Fair – with a Seattle Symphony performance featuring Igor Stravinsky as a guest conductor and Van Cliburn as a guest soloist.

The Opera House hosted several performances during the World's Fair, including live telecasts of The Ed Sullivan Show, a science fiction panel discussion featuring Ray Bradbury and Rod Serling, as well as multiple concerts and dance performances featuring acts from around the world. The Seattle Opera company was founded in 1963 and held its first season in the Opera House in 1964. Pacific Northwest Ballet was founded in 1972 and held its first season in the Opera House in 1973. Seattle Symphony held its final concert in the Opera House on June 30, 1998, and moved to the newly completed Benaroya Hall soon after.

In 1999, voters passed a bond measure to fund another major renovation to the Opera House. The "most dramatic" renovation and expansion of the Opera House began in 2002. Cell phone pioneer Craig McCaw along with his three brothers donated $20 million to help fund construction and as a result the newly renovated building was named Marion Oliver McCaw Hall, after their mother. LMN Architects oversaw the renovation and McCaw Hall opened in late June 2003. The first concert at the renovated venue took place on September 29, 2003.

References

External links
McCaw Hall's official website site
Seattle Opera's official site
Pacific Northwest Ballet's official site
Landscape Online info about "Dreaming in Color"

Opera houses in Washington (state)
Culture of Seattle
Buildings and structures in Seattle
Seattle Center
Tourist attractions in Seattle
Music venues completed in 1928
Theatres completed in 1928
1928 establishments in Washington (state)
Music venues in Washington (state)
World's fair architecture in Seattle